Jamil Rostami (born 1971 in Sanandaj, Kurdistan Province, Iran) is a Kurdish film director.

In 2002 he made his first short film titled The Trouble of Being a Boy in Kurdish, which was screened in 24 domestic and international Festivals and was awarded several prizes.

He made his first feature-length film, Requiem of Snow, in 2005. Fariborz Lachini, one of the most famous Iranian film music composers, made the music of the film. The photography of the film was done by Morteza Poursamadi, a celebrated Iranian photographer. The movie was awarded prestigious Crystal Simorgh for the best director in Asia and Middle East Films section of the International Fajr Film Festival. A joint production of Iran and Iraq, Requiem of Snow was the first film to represent Iraq in the Best Foreign Language Film category at the Oscars.

His latest film, Jani Gal, is a Kurdish language drama, about Kurdish separatists in the 1940s and 1950 trying to create a Kurdish state from parts of Iran and Iraq. This film was also selected to represent Iraq in the Best Foreign Language Film category at the Oscars.

References
 Iranian film selected as Iraqi representative in the Oscars

External links
Biography

Iranian film directors
Kurdish film directors
Iranian Kurdish people
People from Sanandaj
1971 births
Living people